Human Spider, The Human Spider or The Human-Spider may refer to:

People
 Bill Strother, who scaled the Heard Building in 1922
 Real-life comparisons of the Marvel character Spider-Man including:
 Alain Robert (born 1962), French rock climber and urban climber

Characters
 Arachnida from The Show, a 1927 American silent film
 Fineas Sproule from Billy the Kid's Old Timey Oddities, an American comic book series
 Mankot, the ride of Gojo from the comic book Gojo
 Human Spider, Peter Parker's introductory alternate name in the 2002 Spider-Man film
 The Human Spider, a contestant in the "Superhero Tryouts" segment of the BBC comedy sketch show The Wrong Door

Television
 "The Human Spider", a 2008 episode of the Channel 4 documentary Cutting Edge

See also
 Spider-Man (nickname)
 Spider-Man (disambiguation)
 Spider (nickname)
 Spider Sisters, conjoined twins Ganga and Jamuna Mondal